Germ cell-less, spermatogenesis associated 1 is a protein that in humans is encoded by the GMCL1 gene.

Function

This gene encodes a nuclear envelope protein that appears to be involved in spermatogenesis, either directly or by influencing genes that play a more direct role in the process. This multi-exon locus is the homolog of the mouse and drosophila germ cell-less gene but the human genome also contains a single-exon locus on chromosome 5 that contains an open reading frame capable of encoding a highly related protein.

References

Further reading